Music in My Life is the second Japanese album of K. Despite the success of his first album, Beyond the Sea, his single sales have been dropping after the 1 Litre of Tears heat died down, as a result, the album only made it to an average #25 on the Oricon Album Charts. It was released in CD+DVD and CD-only versions. The CD+DVD version features live clips from his performance at NHK Hall in May 2006 and includes a bonus, 24-page color photobook.

Track listing

CD

DVD
 Together Forever
 抱きしめたい (Dakishimetai)
 over...
 Play Another One
 Only Human
 Bye My Friends

References

External links 
 http://www.k-official.com/

2006 albums
K (singer) albums